Prince Michael may refer to:

Mikhail Semyonovich Vorontsov (1782–1856)
Mikheil, Prince of Abkhazia (?–1866)
Prince Michael of Montenegro (1908–1986)
Michael I of Romania (1921–2017)
Prince Michael of Greece and Denmark (born 1939), grandson of George I of Greece
Prince Michael of Kent (born 1942), grandson of George V of the United Kingdom
Prince Michael of Yugoslavia (born 1985), son of Prince Tomislav of Yugoslavia
Mihailo Obrenović, Prince of Serbia from 1839 to 1842
Prince Michael and Prince Michael II (nicknamed Blanket), sons of singer Michael Jackson
Romanov Family Association, princes in pretence
Prince Michael of Sealand (born 1952)